The Dunn Thing was an English post-punk band, formed by the brothers Mike and Frank Dunne, after leaving the Manchester post-punk band The Immediates in 1980. That band also featured Andy Connell, later a member of A Certain Ratio before forming Swing Out Sister in 1985. 

The Dunn Thing released two singles on MCA Records: "Sticking to My Guns" and a cover of the Northern Soul classic "Ain't Nothing But a House Party". Mike Dunne subsequently released a solo album, Lost Soul, on Herb Tea Records. Frank Dunne left the music industry for sports journalism, and is currently an Italian football correspondent for The Independent newspaper.

English rock music groups
English post-punk music groups